The Cambrian Period (sometimes symbolized Ꞓ) is the first geological period of the Paleozoic Era, and of the Phanerozoic Eon. The Cambrian lasted 53.4 million years from the end of the preceding Ediacaran Period 538.8 million years ago (mya) to the beginning of the Ordovician Period  mya. Its subdivisions, and its base, are somewhat in flux. The period was established as "Cambrian series" by Adam Sedgwick, who named it after Cambria, the Latin name for 'Cymru' (Wales), where Britain's Cambrian rocks are best exposed. Sedgwick identified the layer as part of his task, along with Roderick Murchison, to subdivide the large "Transition Series", although the two geologists disagreed for a while on the appropriate categorization. The Cambrian is unique in its unusually high proportion of  sedimentary deposits, sites of exceptional preservation where "soft" parts of organisms are preserved as well as their more resistant shells. As a result, our understanding of the Cambrian biology surpasses that of some later periods.

The Cambrian marked a profound change in life on Earth: prior to the Cambrian, the majority of living organisms on the whole were small, unicellular and simple (Ediacaran fauna being notable exceptions). Complex, multicellular organisms gradually became more common in the millions of years immediately preceding the Cambrian, but it was not until this period that mineralized – hence readily fossilized – organisms became common. The rapid diversification of lifeforms in the Cambrian, known as the Cambrian explosion, produced the first representatives of all modern animal phyla. Phylogenetic analysis has supported the view that before the Cambrian radiation, in the Cryogenian or Tonian, animals (metazoans) evolved monophyletically from a single common ancestor: flagellated colonial protists similar to modern choanoflagellates.
Although diverse life forms prospered in the oceans, the land is thought to have been comparatively barren – with nothing more complex than a microbial soil crust and a few molluscs and arthropods (albeit not terrestrial) that emerged to browse on the microbial biofilm. By the end of the Cambrian, myriapods, arachnids, and hexapods started adapting to the land, along with the first plants. Most of the continents were probably dry and rocky due to a lack of vegetation. Shallow seas flanked the margins of several continents created during the breakup of the supercontinent Pannotia. The seas were relatively warm, and polar ice was absent for much of the period.

Stratigraphy 

The Cambrian Period followed the Ediacaran Period and was followed by the Ordovician Period.

The base of the Cambrian lies atop a complex assemblage of trace fossils known as the Treptichnus pedum assemblage.
The use of Treptichnus pedum, a reference ichnofossil to mark the lower boundary of the Cambrian, is problematic because very similar trace fossils belonging to the Treptichnids group are found well below T. pedum in Namibia, Spain and Newfoundland, and possibly in the western USA. The stratigraphic range of T. pedum overlaps the range of the Ediacaran fossils in Namibia, and probably in Spain.

Subdivisions  
The Cambrian is divided into four epochs (series) and ten ages (stages). Currently only three series and six stages are named and have a GSSP (an internationally agreed-upon stratigraphic reference point).

Because the international stratigraphic subdivision is not yet complete, many local subdivisions are still widely used. In some of these subdivisions the Cambrian is divided into three epochs with locally differing names – the Early Cambrian (Caerfai or Waucoban,  mya), Middle Cambrian (St Davids or Albertan,  mya) and Late Cambrian ( mya; also known as Merioneth or Croixan). 
Trilobite zones allow biostratigraphic correlation in the Cambrian. Rocks of these epochs are referred to as belonging to the Lower, Middle, or Upper Cambrian.

Each of the local series is divided into several stages. The Cambrian is divided into several regional faunal stages of which the Russian-Kazakhian system is most used in international parlance:

*Most Russian paleontologists define the lower boundary of the Cambrian at the base of the Tommotian Stage, characterized by diversification and global distribution of organisms with mineral skeletons and the appearance of the first Archaeocyath bioherms.

Dating the Cambrian 

The lower boundary of the Cambrian was originally held to represent the first appearance of complex life, represented by trilobites. The recognition of small shelly fossils before the first trilobites, and Ediacara biota substantially earlier, led to calls for a more precisely defined base to the Cambrian Period.

Despite the long recognition of its distinction from younger Ordovician rocks and older Precambrian rocks, it was not until 1994 that the Cambrian system/period was internationally ratified. After decades of careful consideration, a continuous sedimentary sequence at Fortune Head, Newfoundland was settled upon as a formal base of the Cambrian Period, which was to be correlated worldwide by the earliest appearance of Treptichnus pedum. Discovery of this fossil a few metres below the GSSP led to the refinement of this statement, and it is the T. pedum ichnofossil assemblage that is now formally used to correlate the base of the Cambrian.

This formal designation allowed radiometric dates to be obtained from samples across the globe that corresponded to the base of the Cambrian. Early dates of  quickly gained favour, though the methods used to obtain this number are now considered to be unsuitable and inaccurate. The ash horizon in Oman from which this date was recovered corresponds to a marked fall in the abundance of carbon-13 that correlates to equivalent excursions elsewhere in the world, and to the disappearance of distinctive Ediacaran fossils (Namacalathus, Cloudina). Nevertheless, there are arguments that the dated horizon in Oman does not correspond to the Ediacaran-Cambrian boundary, but represents a facies change from marine to evaporite-dominated strata – which would mean that dates from other sections, ranging from 544 or 542 Ma, are more suitable.

Paleogeography 
Plate reconstructions suggest a global supercontinent, Pannotia, was in the process of breaking up early in the Cambrian, with Laurentia (North America), Baltica, and Siberia having separated from the main supercontinent of Gondwana to form isolated land masses. Most continental land was clustered in the Southern Hemisphere at this time, but was drifting north. Large, high-velocity rotational movement of Gondwana appears to have occurred in the Early Cambrian.

With a lack of sea ice – the great glaciers of the Marinoan Snowball Earth were long melted – the sea level was high, which led to large areas of the continents being flooded in warm, shallow seas ideal for sea life. The sea levels fluctuated somewhat, suggesting there were "ice ages", associated with pulses of expansion and contraction of a south polar ice cap.

In Baltoscandia a Lower Cambrian transgression transformed large swathes of the Sub-Cambrian peneplain into an epicontinental sea.

Climate 
Glaciers likely existed during the earliest Cambrian at high and possibly even at middle palaeolatitudes, possibly due to the ancient continent of Gondwana covering the South Pole and cutting off polar ocean currents. Middle Terreneuvian deposits, corresponding to the boundary between the Fortunian and Stage 2, show evidence of glaciation. However, other authors believe these very early, pretrilobitic glacial deposits may not even be of Cambrian age at all but instead date back to the Neoproterozoic, an era characterised by numerous severe icehouse periods. The beginning of Stage 3 was relatively cool, with the period between 521 and 517 Ma being known as the Cambrian Arthropod Radiation Cool Event (CARCE). The Earth was generally very warm during Stage 4; its climate was comparable to the hot greenhouse of the Late Cretaceous and Early Palaeogene, as evidenced by a maximum in continental weathering rates over the last 900 million years and the presence of tropical, lateritic palaeosols at high palaeolatitudes during this time. The Archaecyathid Extinction Warm Event (AEWE), lasting from 511 to 510.5 Ma, was particularly warm. Another warm event, the Redlichiid-Olenid Extinction Warm Event, occurred at the beginning of Stage 5. It became even warmer towards the end of the period, and sea levels rose dramatically. This warming trend continued into the Early Ordovician, the start of which was characterised by an extremely hot global climate.

Flora 
The Cambrian flora was little different from the Ediacaran. The principal taxa were the marine macroalgae Fuxianospira, Sinocylindra, and Marpolia. No calcareous macroalgae are known from the period.

No land plant (embryophyte) fossils are known from the Cambrian. However, biofilms and microbial mats were well developed on Cambrian tidal flats and beaches 500 mya, and microbes forming microbial Earth ecosystems, comparable with modern soil crust of desert regions, contributing to soil formation. Although molecular clock estimates suggest terrestrial plants may have first emerged during the Middle or Late Cambrian, the consequent large-scale removal of the greenhouse gas CO2 from the atmosphere through sequestration did not begin until the Ordovician.

Oceanic life 

The Cambrian explosion was a period of rapid multicellular growth. Most animal life during the Cambrian was aquatic. Trilobites were once assumed to be the dominant life form at that time, but this has proven to be incorrect. Arthropods were by far the most dominant animals in the ocean, but trilobites were only a minor part of the total arthropod diversity. What made them so apparently abundant was their heavy armor reinforced by calcium carbonate (CaCO3), which fossilized far more easily than the fragile chitinous exoskeletons of other arthropods, leaving numerous preserved remains.

The period marked a steep change in the diversity and composition of Earth's biosphere. The Ediacaran biota suffered a mass extinction at the start of the Cambrian Period, which corresponded with an increase in the abundance and complexity of burrowing behaviour. This behaviour had a profound and irreversible effect on the substrate which transformed the seabed ecosystems. Before the Cambrian, the sea floor was covered by microbial mats. By the end of the Cambrian, burrowing animals had destroyed the mats in many areas through bioturbation. As a consequence, many of those organisms that were dependent on the mats became extinct, while the other species adapted to the changed environment that now offered new ecological niches. Around the same time there was a seemingly rapid appearance of representatives of all the mineralized phyla, including the Bryozoa, which were once thought to have only appeared in the Lower Ordovician. However, many of those phyla were represented only by stem-group forms; and since mineralized phyla generally have a benthic origin, they may not be a good proxy for (more abundant) non-mineralized phyla.

While the early Cambrian showed such diversification that it has been named the Cambrian Explosion, this changed later in the period, when there occurred a sharp drop in biodiversity. About 515 million years ago, the number of species going extinct exceeded the number of new species appearing. Five million years later, the number of genera had dropped from an earlier peak of about 600 to just 450. Also, the speciation rate in many groups was reduced to between a fifth and a third of previous levels. 500 million years ago, oxygen levels fell dramatically in the oceans, leading to hypoxia, while the level of poisonous hydrogen sulfide simultaneously increased, causing another extinction. The later half of Cambrian was surprisingly barren and showed evidence of several rapid extinction events; the stromatolites which had been replaced by reef building sponges known as Archaeocyatha, returned once more as the archaeocyathids became extinct. This declining trend did not change until the Great Ordovician Biodiversification Event.

Some Cambrian organisms ventured onto land, producing the trace fossils Protichnites and Climactichnites. Fossil evidence suggests that euthycarcinoids, an extinct group of arthropods, produced at least some of the Protichnites. Fossils of the track-maker of Climactichnites have not been found; however, fossil trackways and resting traces suggest a large, slug-like mollusc.

In contrast to later periods, the Cambrian fauna was somewhat restricted; free-floating organisms were rare, with the majority living on or close to the sea floor; and mineralizing animals were rarer than in future periods, in part due to the unfavourable ocean chemistry.

These include Sirius Passet, the Sinsk Algal Lens, the Maotianshan Shales, the Emu Bay Shale, and the Burgess Shale,.

Symbol
The United States Federal Geographic Data Committee uses a "barred capital C"  character to represent the Cambrian Period.

Gallery

See also 
 Cambrian–Ordovician extinction event – circa 488 mya
 Dresbachian extinction event—circa 499 mya
 End Botomian extinction event—circa 513 mya
 List of fossil sites (with link directory)
 Type locality (geology), the locality where a particular rock type, stratigraphic unit, fossil or mineral species is first identified

References

Further reading

External links 

 
 Biostratigraphy – includes information on Cambrian trilobite biostratigraphy
  Dr. Sam Gon's trilobite pages (contains numerous Cambrian trilobites)
 Examples of Cambrian Fossils
 Paleomap Project
 Report on the web on Amthor and others from Geology vol. 31
 Weird Life on the Mats
 Chronostratigraphy scale v.2018/08 | Cambrian

 
Geological periods